Astrothelium mediocrassum is a species of corticolous (bark-dwelling), crustose lichen in the family Trypetheliaceae. Found in Guyana, it was formally described as a new species in 2016 by Dutch lichenologist André Aptroot. Its ascospores are hyaline, spindle-shaped (fusiform), and muriform (i.e., divided into internal chambers by transverse and longitudinal septa), with dimensions of 70–80 by 22–25 µm. This is the smallest ascospore size of Astrothelia species. The middle, or median, septum of the spore is thickened in comparison with the others. No lichen products were detected using thin-layer chromatography. It is somewhat similar in appearance to Astrothelium octosporum, but that species has lichexanthone in its thallus and pseudostromata.

References

mediocrassum
Lichen species
Lichens described in 2016
Lichens of Guyana
Taxa named by André Aptroot